Saint-Christol-lès-Alès (literally Saint-Christol near Alès) is a commune in the Gard department in southern France.

Climate
Temperatures reached 44.1 °C (111.4 °F) in Saint-Christol-lès-Alès and Conqueyrac on 12 August 2003 during the 2003 European heat wave. They were France's highest temperatures ever recorded until 28 June 2019, when temperatures reached as high as 45.9 °C (114.6 °F) in southern France.

Population

See also
Communes of the Gard department

References

External links

Communes of Gard